Dominik Meffert was the defending champion, but lost to Guillaume Rufin in the semifinals.

Rufin won the title, defeating Peter Gojowczyk in the final, 6–3, 6–4.

Seeds

Draw

Finals

Top half

Bottom half

References
 Main Draw
 Qualifying Draw

Oberstaufen Cup - Singles
2013 Singles